The TÜBİTAK Informatics and Information Security Research Center, shortly TÜBİTAK BİLGEM, is a Turkish scientific and technological center carrying out research projects through its subordinate institutes on various fields of informatics. It was established in 2010 by the Scientific and Technological Research Council of Turkey (TÜBİTAK) in Gebze, Kocaeli Province as an umbrella institution of the existing Information Technologies Institute (BTE) and National Research Institute of Electronics and Cryptology (UEKAE) following their transfer from the TÜBİTAK Marmara Research Center.

History
In 2011, the existing Research Institute of Fundamental Sciences (TBAE) was transferred to BİLGEM relocating its facilities as well to the campus in Gebze.

The center established the Research Institute of Software Development (YTE) and the Cyber Security Institute (SGE) in 2012.

Organization
BİLGEM consists of six institutes as following:
 Advanced Technologies Research Institute (İLTAREN)
 Cyber Security Institute (SGE)
 National Research Institute of Electronics and Cryptology (UEKAE)
 Research Institute of Fundamental Sciences (TBAE)
 Information Technologies Institute (BTE)
 Research Institute of Software Development (YTE)

See also
 Pardus is a Linux distribution  developed by the National Research Institute of Electronics and Cryptology (UEKAE).

References

Scientific and Technological Research Council of Turkey
Organizations established in 2010
2010 establishments in Turkey
Organizations based in Gebze
Research institutes in Turkey